

News

January
2 - Kristin Størmer Steira wins the second race of the Tour de Ski and claims the yellow jersey with previous leader Marit Bjørgen only finishing in 25th position 55.5 seconds behind Steira who now leads the rankings by 6.1 seconds. In the men's competition leader Christoph Eigenmann does not finish and thus loses his yellow jersey to Simen Østensen who finished in 12th position, 11.6 seconds behind winner Vincent Vittoz.
3 - During the second race in Oberstdorf, the third in total for the Tour de Ski, leader Kristin Størmer Steira successfully defends her yellow jersey by finishing second behind Petra Majdič who follows in second position in the overall rankings, 20.4 seconds behind Steira. Franz Göring wins the men's race being the first of three Germans entering the podium, the others being René Sommerfeldt and Tobias Angerer. With leader Simen Østensen finishing in 18th position Angerer overtook him to take the yellow jersey and now leads by 17.0 seconds.

Cross-country skiing World Cup

Men's results

Women's results

Tour de Ski

Men's results

Women's results

References